Jeremy Scrivener (born 19 November 1965) is an Australian actor. He is best known for his appearances on the television series Bananas in Pyjamas and The Girl from Tomorrow Part II: Tomorrow's End. Jeremy was a student of National Institute of Dramatic Art in Sydney, from which he graduated in 1990.

Filmography

Television
 Bananas in Pyjamas – Morgan (1992–2001)

 Play School – Himself (1992–1994)
 The Girl from Tomorrow Part II: Tomorrow's End – Nik (1993)

Shorts
 Bitch (film) (1995)

Theatre
Away, State Theatre Company of South Australia – Tom (1987)

References

External links

1965 births
Living people
Australian male television actors
Australian male stage actors
Male actors from Hobart
Australian children's television presenters
National Institute of Dramatic Art alumni